Fenmetozole (DH-524) is a drug which was patented as an antidepressant, but was later studied as an antagonist of the effects of ethanol, though results were poor and it even increased its effects in some cases. It acts as an α2-adrenergic receptor antagonist similarly to other imidazoles like idazoxan. It was never marketed.

Fenoxazoline has the precise same formula, albeit instead of the 3',4'-dich, an ortho-isopropyl group was chosen instead.

References 

Abandoned drugs
Alpha-2 blockers
Antidepressants
Chloroarenes
Imidazolines